The Korean Series is the final championship series of the KBO League. From  to 2013, the winner of the Korean Series went on to play in the Asia Series.

The teams finishing in third and fourth place in the regular season face each other in the first round of the play-offs. The winner of the first round faces the team that finished in second place during the regular season, and the winner of that round faces the team that finished in first place for the championship in the Korean Series. The Wild Card Game between the teams finishing in fourth and fifth place in the regular season was added to the KBO League postseason in 2015.

All championships are a best-of-seven playoff series between the league pennant winner and the winner of the second round of the play-offs. If the game ends in a tie, more games would be scheduled until any one of the teams wins four games.

Korean Series winners
* Note: Winning team and losing team columns indicate the number of times that team has appeared in a Korean Series as well as each respective teams' Korean Series record to date.

* Note: Games in the KBO League have a limit to the number of extra innings and/or time that could be played before being officially declared a tied game (except in 2008 when this rule was removed). When post-season games were declared tied, they had to be replayed.

Series appearances by club
In the sortable table below, teams are ordered first by number of appearances, then by number of wins, and finally by year of first appearance. In the "Season(s)" column, bold years indicate winning appearances.

See also
 Korea Baseball Organization#Awards
 Baseball awards#South Korea

Notes
  The 1982, 1983, 1993, and 2006 Korean Series each included one tied game. The 2004 Korean Series had three tied games.
  No Korean Series played, the Samsung Lions won the title outright in the 1985 season.
  The Hyundai Unicorns franchise was disbanded at the end of the 2007 season.

References

 
Recurring sporting events established in 1982
October sporting events